Publius agassizi is a beetle of the family Passalidae, named in honor of Louis Agassiz.

Passalidae
Beetles described in 1871